Wetumpka Municipal Airport  is a city-owned, public-use airport located six nautical miles (6.9 mi, 11.1 km) west of the central business district of Wetumpka, a city in Elmore County, Alabama, United States. It is included in the FAA's National Plan of Integrated Airport Systems for 2011–2015, which categorized it as a general aviation facility.  During World War II the airport, known then as Elmore Auxiliary Field, served as an auxiliary field for Gunter Army Airfield training operations.  In 2013 the airport was listed in the Alabama Register of Landmarks and Heritage.

Facilities and aircraft 
It has two runways: 9/27 is 3,011 by 80 feet (918 x 24 m) with an asphalt surface; 18/36 is 2,876 by 130 feet (877 x 40 m) with a turf surface.

For the 12-month period ending December 7, 2010, the airport had 39,400 general aviation aircraft operations, an average of 107 per day. At that time there were 80 aircraft based at this airport: 89% single-engine, 9% multi-engine, 1% helicopter and 1% glider.

References

External links 
 

Airports in Alabama
Buildings and structures in Elmore County, Alabama
Transportation in Elmore County, Alabama